Gafur Mazrreku was a member of Socialist Party of Albania. He was a deputy in parliament. He was sentenced to 11 years after he shot Azem Hajdari in parliament. The altercation took place two days after the men had an altercation in a dispute over value-added tax legislation. He was released after five years under an amnesty granted by Prime Minister Fatos Nano.

References

Members of the Parliament of Albania
Living people
Socialist Party of Albania politicians
Albanian prisoners and detainees
Prisoners and detainees of Albania
Albanian criminals
Year of birth missing (living people)
1997 crimes in Albania
People convicted of attempted murder